The Battle of Jankau, also known as Jankov, Jankow, or Jankowitz, took place in central Bohemia, on 6 March 1645. One of the last major battles of the 1618 to 1648 Thirty Years' War, it was fought between Swedish and Imperial armies, each containing around 16,000 men. The more mobile and better led Swedes under Lennart Torstensson effectively destroyed their opponents, commanded by Melchior von Hatzfeldt. However, the devastation caused by decades of conflict meant armies now spent much of their time obtaining supplies, and the Swedes were unable to take advantage.

Imperial forces regained control of Bohemia in 1646, but inconclusive campaigns in the Rhineland and Saxony made it clear neither side had the strength or resources to impose a military solution. Although fighting continued as participants tried to improve their positions, it increased the urgency of negotiations which culminated in the 1648 Peace of Westphalia.

Background

The Thirty Years' War began in 1618 when the Protestant-dominated Bohemian Estates offered the Crown to fellow Protestant Frederick V of the Palatinate, rather than conservative Catholic Emperor Ferdinand II. Most members of the Holy Roman Empire remained neutral, and the Bohemian Revolt was quickly suppressed. Financed by Maximilian of Bavaria, an army of the Catholic League launched the Palatinate campaign, and sent Frederick into exile in the Dutch Republic.

Frederick's replacement by Maximilian as ruler and Prince-elector of the Palatinate changed the nature of the war, drawing in Protestant German states like Saxony and Brandenburg-Prussia, as well as external powers like Denmark-Norway. In 1630, Gustavus Adolphus of Sweden invaded Pomerania, partly to support his Protestant co-religionists, but also to control the Baltic trade, which provided much of Sweden's income.

Swedish intervention continued despite the death of Gustavus at Lützen in November 1632, but their objectives conflicted with both Imperial states like Saxony, and their regional rivals, such as Denmark. Most of Sweden's Protestant German allies made peace with Emperor Ferdinand II in the 1635 Treaty of Prague. As a result, the war lost much of its religious nature, and became into a contest between the Empire and Sweden, who was supported by France, and George Rákóczi, Prince of Transylvania.

Emperor Ferdinand III, who succeeded his father in 1637, initiated  peace talks in 1643, then delayed negotiations, hoping his position would improve after a planned 1644 military offensive. However, the Swedes first defeated the Danes, who had re-entered the war as an Imperial ally, then destroyed an Imperial army in Saxony. Despite victory at Freiburg in August, the Bavarians under Franz von Mercy could not prevent French troops capturing Philippsburg, and occupying Lorraine. Mercy withdrew into Franconia, establishing winter quarters at Heilbronn.

For 1645, Swedish commander Lennart Torstensson proposed a three-part offensive, intended to compel Ferdinand III to agree terms. It envisaged three simultaneous attacks, in order to prevent Imperial forces supporting each other. While France attacked Bavaria, Torstensson would lead his army into Bohemia; they would be joined here by Rákóczi, and their combined force would then move against the Imperial capital, Vienna. While roughly equal in numbers, the Swedish army in Bohemia was far better integrated, and despite poor health, Torstensson was an energetic and experienced general, with capable officers. Although his opponent Melchior von Hatzfeldt was a competent tactical leader, he was unable to control his subordinates, Johann von Götzen, and Johann von Werth. In addition, many of his troops were poorly equipped remnants from defeated armies, his best unit being 5,000 veteran Bavarian cavalry under von Werth.

Battle

In late January, Torstensson took advantage of the frozen ground to enter Bohemia, near Chomutov. The Imperial army had established winter quarters near Plzeň; unsure of Swedish intentions, von Hatzfeldt held his position to protect Prague. On 18 February, the Swedes passed  to the west, and the two sides spent the next three weeks tracking each other along either side of the Vltava river. In early March, a sudden freeze allowed Torstensson to cross near Staré Sedlo;  von Hatzfeldt followed, reaching Tábor on 4 March, where he made contact with Swedish cavalry. On 5 March, he withdrew to the hills around Jankov, and prepared for battle the next day.

Hatzfeldt selected a strong position; the hills and woods negated the superior Swedish artillery, his centre was protected by a stream, the right by a steep slope and deep forest. His left was the most vulnerable, with open ground directly to its front, overlooked by a hill to the south, known as 'Kappellhodjen' or Chapel Hill. In a conference the night before, Torstensson and his senior officers recognised the drawbacks, but agreed to an assault; their co-ordinated attack contrasted with command failures among the Imperial generals.

The battle consisted of two parts, the first from dawn to midday, the second from early afternoon until nightfall. Around 6:00 am, a Swedish column under Robert Douglas feinted against the Imperial right, while their main force moved around their left. After ordering Götzen to post a detachment on Chapel Hill, Hatzfeldt set off to assess Douglas' move, which he correctly deduced was a diversion. On his return, he discovered Götzen had misinterpreted his orders, moving his entire force towards the hill; it became stuck in the woods and broken ground, giving the Swedes time to install artillery and infantry at the crest. After a furious argument, Götzen launched a series of attacks, which were repulsed with heavy loss; just after 9:15 am, he was killed, and his troops withdrew.

Hatzfeldt moved troops from the centre to cover the retreat of Götzen's men, but unlike the lighter Swedish guns, their artillery got stuck in the mud, and were captured by Arvid Wittenberg. Cavalry charges led by Werth kept the Swedes at a safe distance, and the two armies broke contact just before midday. Having cleared the road to Olomouc, Torstensson decided to allow the Imperial army to withdraw, hoping to re-organise his exhausted troops prior to setting off.

However, Hatzfeldt felt the Swedes were too close for him to retreat in safety, and opted to hold his position until nightfall. Seeing this, Torstensson moved his guns forward, firing at close range into the helpless Imperial infantry. Werth charged and scattered the Swedish right, before his cavalry stopped to loot the baggage train, where they captured Torstensson's wife. The Swedish cavalry reformed and counter-attacked, inflicting heavy casualties; only 1,500 of the 5,000 Bavarians made it back to Munich. Left isolated, the infantry surrendered, with 4,450 taken prisoner, including Hatzfeldt, with another 4,000 killed or wounded; of the 36 regiments involved, only 2,697 men were present in Prague a week later, with another 2,000 left scattered in Moravia. Swedish losses were 3,000 or 4,000 in total.

Aftermath

Hearing of the defeat, Ferdinand and his brother Archduke Leopold quickly scraped together another army; by early May, Leopold had around 15,000 men. Although it could not match the Swedish veterans, 25 years of constant war had devastated the countryside; armies spent more time foraging than fighting, drastically reducing their ability to sustain campaigns, or maintain positions.

This forced Torstensson into an attempt on the strategically placed town of Brno, which had an Imperial garrison of 1,500 under de Souches, a French Protestant exile. The Swedes were joined there by 14,200 Transylvanian troops; mostly unpaid and unfed, this worsened the supply issues, and the besiegers lost over 8,000 men, from disease, hunger, and desertion. With the opening of the 1645 to 1669 Cretan War, the Ottomans withdrew their support from Rákóczi; in return, Ferdinand renewed the Peace of Zsitvatorok, forcing the Transylvanians to make peace, and lifting the siege of Brno.

The end of the Danish war in favour of Sweden encouraged Torstensson to make one last attempt on Vienna, but by October, fewer than 10,000 Swedes faced 20,000 Imperialists. He retreated into Saxony, and relinquished command to Wrangel on 23 December; by February 1646, the Swedes had been totally expelled from Bohemia.

However, Ferdinand could not also support his allies in Bavaria and Saxony. While the French campaign in Bavaria ended in stalemate, Torstensson's three part strategy finally proved its worth when Königsmarck burst into Saxony; without hope of reinforcement, Elector John George agreed a six-month truce in September 1645. Accepting a military solution was no longer possible, Ferdinand instructed his representatives at Westphalia to begin serious negotiations.

References

Sources

Jankau
Jankau
Jankau
Jankau
1645 in Europe
Jankau